Parineeta is a 2005 Indian Hindi-language musical romance film adaptation of Sarat Chandra Chattopadhyay's 1914 Bengali novella of the same name. Directed by debutant Pradeep Sarkar, it was based upon a screenplay by the film's producer, Vidhu Vinod Chopra. The film stars Vidya Balan (in her Bollywood debut) alongside Saif Ali Khan and Sanjay Dutt in lead roles, with Raima Sen, Sabyasachi Chakrabarty and Dia Mirza in supporting roles. The film has several notable allusions to Indian literature and cinema.

Parineeta primarily revolves around the lead characters, Lalita and Shekhar. Since childhood, Shekhar and Lalita have been friends and slowly this friendship blossoms into love. A series of misunderstandings surface and they are separated due to the conniving schemes of Shekhar's father. The plot deepens with the arrival of Girish, who supports Lalita's family. Eventually, Shekhar's love defies his father's greed and he seeks out Lalita.

Parineeta released on 10 June 2005, and despite pre-release inhibitions, it proved to be a commercial success at the box office, grossing ₹32.63 crore worldwide. It received positive reviews upon release, with praise for its screenplay, soundtrack, production design, costumes and performances of the cast; however its pacing and climax received criticism. It was showcased at several international film festivals.

At the 53rd National Film Awards, Parineeta won Best Debut Film of a Director (Sarkar). At the 51st Filmfare Awards, the film received a leading 13 nominations, including Best Film, Best Director (Sarkar), Best Actor (Khan) and Best Actress (Balan) and Best Supporting Actor (Dutt), and won 4 awards, including Best Female Debut (Balan).

Plot
The story takes place in 1962 in Kolkata. As the credits roll, scenes from erstwhile Calcutta are displayed along with the narrator's (Amitabh Bachchan) introduction of the era.

On the night of his arranged marriage to Gayatri Tantiya, (the daughter of one of his father's business connections), Shekhar has images of his childhood friend, Lalita, calling him by his name flashing through his mind.

Meanwhile, downstairs, musical celebrations begin as Shekhar meets Vasundhara, a widow from his neighbourhood, who is thankful to her son-in-law, Girish (Sanjay Dutt), for supporting their family after the death of her husband, Gurcharan. Lalita, who is present there, playfully confronts Shekhar as to why he is being indifferent to her. Shekhar admonishes her for speaking so in spite of being married.

An angry Shekhar comes back home to play a favourite tune from the past on his piano. The flashback shows a young Shekhar playing Rabindranath Tagore’s tune on his piano while young Lalita and Koel are around. Lalita, with her parents having died in a car accident, lives with Gurcharan’s family. Koel is her cousin whereas Charu is her neighbour. As this scene flashes across Shekhar’s mind, he sings a song full of sadness and loss. As time flies, they grow up to become close friends. The rebellious and musically inclined Shekhar spends his days playing the music of Rabindranath Tagore or Elvis Presley and composing his own songs with Lalita rather than becoming part of his shrewd father's business. Part of this rebellion involves resistance to meeting Gayatri Tantiya, the beautiful but devious daughter of a wealthy industrialist, whom his father would like Shekhar to marry. Meanwhile, Girish, a steel tycoon from London, makes a dramatic entry into Charu’s house. Girish seems smitten by Lalita while Koel is by Girish. Shekhar is visibly jealous of Lalita’s close friendship with Girish.

One day, a shocked Lalita, who is employed at the Roy’s office, remembers a hotel project from Gurcharan’s ancestral haveli (palatial house). On an earlier occasion, Gurcharan had borrowed money from Naveen Roy after putting his haveli on mortgage. She understands that if the money is not repaid in a few months, Naveen Roy would take over the property. She immediately thinks of asking Shekhar for monetary help. Unforeseen circumstances prevent this, and Girish, upon realising this, alleviates their problem by making Gurcharan his business partner. Gurcharan repays the debt and the turn of events prompts Shekhar to think why Lalita chose to ask Girish for money instead of him. On one auspicious night, Shekhar and Lalita exchange garlands and consummate their "marriage" unbeknownst to anyone else.

While Shekhar is off to Darjeeling on a business trip, Naveen Roy violently thunders at Lalita about the loss of his hotel project, embarrassing and humiliating her. Roy gets a wall built between his and Gurcharan's house symbolising the end of their association. Gurcharan, unable to digest this, suffers a heart attack. Upon Shekhar's return, Roy informs him of the ill-health of his mother and Gurcharan viciously adds a note of Lalita and Girish's marriage. Shekhar is disgusted to hear of the marriage and in his anger he scowls at Lalita, humiliating her like his father. Meanwhile, Girish assists Gurcharan's family and takes them to London for the heart treatment. Misunderstandings follow and upon the family's return from London, Shekhar assumes that Girish and Lalita are married and agrees to marry Gayatri. The film returns to the night of Shekhar's marriage when Girish hands him the ownership papers of Gurcharan's haveli. He shocks Shekhar by telling him that he married Koel because Lalita rejected his marriage proposal. As a conclusion, Shekhar confronts his father and symbolically breaks down the wall separating the two families. He then brings Lalita to his home as his bride much to the delight of his mother.

Cast
 Vidya Balan as Lalita Roy. A woman of dignity with unflinching love for Shekhar. A lovely singer, who resigned to circumstances, upholding her respect when she faces insult.
 Saif Ali Khan as Shekhar Roy. Shows a balance of love for Lalita and jealousy towards Girish. He is a passionate musician. Towards the end his utter hatred for himself transforms him into a cold and bitter person.
 Sanjay Dutt as Girish Sharma. A simple and straightforward businessman who plays Lalita's moral support with warmth and compassion.
 Raima Sen as Koel. Lalita's playful, mischievous and cheerful cousin who is lively, peppy and lives through every moment.
 Dia Mirza as Gayatri Tantiya. A devious socialite who lures for Shekhar with her charm and beauty.
 Achyut Potdar as Gurcharan.
 Sabyasachi Chakrabarty as Navinchandra Roy. Cold at heart, a shrewd and a conniving businessman who even places human values and relationships below his greed for money.
 Surinder Kaur as Rajeshwari Roy. The mother of Shekhar who scornfully watches how badly her husband treats the neighbours and gets ill.
 Kumkum Bhattacharya as Vasundhara Roy. 
 Oindrila Saha as Vasundhara's daughter.
 Tina Dutta as Teenage Lalita
 Supriya Shukla as Sunita
Gita Dey as Shekhar's Grandmother.
 Ninad Kamat as Ajit
 Rekha in a special appearance in the song "Kaisi Paheli Zindagaani"
 Rita Ganguly in a special appearance in the song "Dhinak Dhinak Dha"
 George Baker as Sir William Eckhart
 Kharaj Mukherjee as Singer in Recording Studio

Production

The key elements 
Before Parineeta, Pradeep Sarkar was a well-known personality in the area of advertisements. With 17 years in mainstream advertising and 7 years of advertisement film-making and commercial cinema, he completed about 1000 commercials and 15 music videos. Vidhu Vinod Chopra, the producer, took notice of his music videos and contacted Sarkar to direct some of the music videos of the film Mission Kashmir (2000). After carving a niche in filming music videos, Sarkar gave the thought of filming Parineeta to Chopra. There began the making of the film.

About the film's comparison with the novel, Chopra said in an interview that, as compared to its 1953 namesake film by Bimal Roy, the story was based in the year 1962. He said that it took them one and a half years to script the film, with them adding new characters and emphasizing under-represented characters from the novel. In a separate interview, Chopra admitted that he was actively involved with the screenplay because the film was an adaptation of the novel. When speaking about cinematic adaptation, Chopra gave due credit to Sarkar, and Natarajan Subramaniam (the film's cinematographer), for providing the vintage visuals. Saif Ali Khan once said that the film was initially attempted to be made in a contemporary way. When the film's crew did not find the depiction appealing, the filming began with the 60s look.

Chopra once cited an interesting anecdote about his belief in Sarkar's film-making abilities. He said that he never personally signed the cheques for the film's expenditure. He transferred money into Sarkar's bank account and the cheques were eventually signed by Sarkar and his spouse.

Casting 
Chopra said in an interview that Saif Ali Khan and Vidya Balan were not the first choices for the lead roles in Parineeta. In fact, Abhishek Bachchan was being cast as Shekhar and Saif Ali Khan as Girish. However Abhishek walked out of the project and Saif readily was accepted as a replacement. This fact was corroborated by Saif in an interview when he said that even though Sarkar had faith in his abilities, Chopra was not too keen on having him.

The choice of Vidya Balan came with Sarkar's prior work experience with her in three music videos. Chopra said that Vidya was screen-tested for six months and only then they were sure of her acting abilities. Saif once said that he was not convinced of Vidya's abilities, since Parineeta was to be her first film. He instead hoped to work with established actresses like Aishwarya Rai or Rani Mukherjee. However, after seeing Vidya portray the character of Lalita, he was thoroughly appreciative of her performance. Getting an opportunity to debut with big names from the industry along with a lovely character to portray made Vidya accept the role of Lalita.

The choice of Sanjay Dutt was because of his versatility, said Chopra in an interview. He also said that the affable nature of Sanjay was a plus during film making.

Sreelekha Mitra was approached to portray the role of Gayatri but she refused due to her pregnancy. The role then went to Dia Mirza who liked the script so well that she chose to play the role in spite of it being small. Raima Sen had a similar story with her want to work with the duo of Chopra and Sarkar. The cameo of the veteran actress, Rekha was purely out of her interest in the song, "Kaisi Paheli Zindgani".

Filming and music 
Since Sarkar knew the city of Kolkata very well, the film was primarily shot there. While most of the film was made in Kolkata, a small portion was shot in Darjeeling.

To re-create the 60s era, lot of efforts were made by the producers. For instance, Chopra said that it cost them money and difficulty to procure the green coloured car which was driven by Shekhar in the film. Chopra confirmed the authenticity of the piano used in the song "Piyu Bole", and of the toy train used in the song "Kasto Mazza". About the look of the characters, Mirza said that the 60s look was well captured by the make-up artist, Vidyadar. The song "Kaisi Paheli Zindagani" was based on the tune to Louis Armstrong's "A Kiss to Build a Dream on".

Critics had high expectations from Parineeta's music because of the award-winning music that was provided in some of Chopra's previous films, such as 1942: A Love Story (1994) and Mission Kashmir (2000). Shantanu Moitra, Parineeta's music director composed hundreds of tunes before six of them got finalised after a year's effort. After finalizing the soundtrack, Chopra was appreciative of the musician's abilities when he said that Moitra has the potential to become another R. D. Burman, a yesteryear Bollywood music director.

Cultural and cinematic allusions 
Sarat Chandra Chattopadhyay, the author of Parineeta, was a contemporary of Rabindranath Tagore; both authors documented Bengali life and social issues at the turn of the century. The 2005 cinematic version of Parineeta pays homage to this relationship by referencing Satyajit Ray's film Charulata (1964), which itself is based upon Tagore's noted novella, Nashtanir. Lalita (Parineeta) is dressed to resemble Nashtanir / Charulatas Charu (Madhabi Mukherjee), particularly during the song "Soona Man Ka Aangan", which incorporates Tagore's song "Phoole Phoole Dhole Dhole." In both Parineeta and Charulata, "Phoole Phoole Dhole Dhole" is sung while Lalita and Charu are each on a swing. The film continues the above connection by placing Saif Ali Khan on the same train used in the film Aradhana (1969) which featured his mother, Sharmila Tagore.

This film was the third one to bear resemblance to the novella, the other two being its 1953 namesake film and Sankoch (1976).

Reception

Box-office and ratings 
Parineeta collected over Rs 170 million in India at the end of 2005. Its overseas success was notable as well with gross collections of Rs. 36 million in the United Kingdom, Rs. 35 million in North America, and Rs 15 million in the rest of the overseas.

Reviews, critiques and controversies 
Before its release on 10 June 2005, one preview wondered how the film would fare at the box office. Citing comparisons with the 1953 version, the preview suggested that debutant director, Sarkar's inexperience in film-making, the probable inability of debutant actress, Balan to portray Lalita's character appropriately, suitable 1960s depiction by contemporary actors and musician, Shantanu Moitra's until-then unimpressive soundtracks, could be impediments to a successful adaptation.

Post-release, the same critic said "Vidhu Vinod Chopra's "Parineeta" – a remake of an old classic of the same name...(had) the love story (which) was received well by the younger generation and it went on to become the biggest hit of the year." It was generally well-received by the critics, with one of them terming the film as "...a beautiful story, beautifully told. It approximates what most of us expect, and increasingly yearn for, in vain, our cinematic experience." A reviewer from About.com said that it is "contemporary retelling of...(an) engaging and timeless tale rich with human emotion and universal drama". The reviewer appreciates the film in most of the nuances of film making saying that this is "enhanced by a brilliant musical score, and accentuated by superb performances by Sanjay Dutt, Saif Ali Khan, Raima Sen, Diya Mirza and debutante Vidya Balan in the lead role of Lalita". 3000 copies of the novella were sold within weeks of the film's release, owing to the film's good reception.

Derek Elley from Variety said "A character-driven meller that's a treat for the eyes, with performances to match, "Parineeta" is high-end Bollywood near its best". He also says that, "though the climax is still emotionally powerful, it comes over as overcooked." A mixed review from Mid-Day says "Pradeep Sarkar weaves the story like magic, especially in the first half ... excelling in the detailing ... the vintage look of the film (that stood out) with authentic costumes, props and the roads of Kolkata". However, the review criticised the film's climax terming it as amateur, thereby diluting the whole film's impact. Another such review came from The Hindu which begins by saying "A simple enough story, but Sarkar tells it well, with some great shots of Shekhar and Lalita together." The review eventually says "Except for the end ... where it is too much to bear."

The issue of piracy cropped up when a news article published in The Indian Express exposed the dark side of the film market. Hardly into weeks of the film's release, CDs were being sold at as low as Rs. 40. Another blemish was that Soumitra Dasgupta, a writer and close associate of Sarkar alleged that the film's story had a striking resemblance to his parallel work on the novella. On Saif Ali Khan's 48th birthday, August 16, 2018, it was one of the films to prove his versatility as an actor.

Screenings 
In 2005, Parineetas cast got a red carpet walk when it was the "World Premiere Film" at the International Indian Film Awards (IIFA) weekend in Amsterdam. Owing to this European premiere, Sarkar said that the film had a great opening in the American and English box-offices. The film was on the UK Top Ten films for four consecutive weeks.

The film was chosen among 15 debut works for the 2006 Berlin Film Festival. It received enthusiastic reception from the audience as it ran to packed houses to the Chopra's surprise. Expecting an audience of about 100 Westerners, a critic visiting the festival was surprised to see the cinema hall full and people jostling for seats even on the steps.

At the 24th Annual Minneapolis-St. Paul International Film Festival held in April 2006, Parineeta was the only Indian mainstream cinema to feature among 135 films from 40 countries.

In 2006, the film featured in the Palm Springs International Film Festival, 24th San Francisco International Asian American Film Festival, Indian Film Festival of Los Angeles, Helsinki Film Festival and the International Film Festival of Marrakech.

Awards 
At the 53rd National Film Awards, Sarkar won the Indira Gandhi Award for Best Debut Film of a Director.

 51st Filmfare Awards:

Won

 Best Female Debut – Vidya Balan
 R. D. Burman Award – Shantanu Moitra
 Best Choreography – Howard Rosemeyer for "Kaisi Paheli"
 Best Art Direction – Keshto Mandal, Pradeep Sarkar and Tanushree Sarkar
 Best Sound Design – Bishwadeep Chatterjee

Nominated

 Best Film – Vidhu Vinod Chopra
 Best Director – Pradeep Sarkar
 Best Actor – Saif Ali Khan
 Best Actress – Vidya Balan
 Best Supporting Actor – Sanjay Dutt
 Best Music Director – Shantanu Moitra
 Best Lyricist – Swanand Kirkire for "Piyu Bole"
 Best Male Playback Singer – Sonu Nigam for "Piyu Bole"
 Best Female Playback Singer – Shreya Ghoshal for "Piyu Bole"
 Best Female Playback Singer – Sunidhi Chauhan for "Kaisi Paheli"

DVD 
The first version of the DVD version of Parineeta was released by UTV Motion Pictures on 30 October 2006. It has subtitle options in English, Arabic, Spanish, German, Italian, Malay, and French. An additional disc includes interviews with the actors and a behind the scenes look at the making of the film. It is available in 16:9 Anamorphic widescreen, Dolby Digital 5.1 Surround, progressive 24 FPS, widescreen and NTSC format. The film is also available on Netflix.

Soundtrack 
The soundtrack to Parineeta was released by Tips Music in April 2005. It received positive reviews, with a reviewer stating, "praising the soundtrack of Parineeta leaves you at a loss for superlatives. In each song, the trend was great singing, great composition, and great lyrics". It was later re-released by Zee Music Company in 2018. Shantanu Moitra composed the music and Lyrics were penned by Swanand Kirkire.

See also

 Indira Gandhi Award for Best Debut Film of a Director

References

External links 
 
 Parineeta at Rediff.com
 Parineeta at Bollywood Hungama

2000s Hindi-language films
2005 romantic drama films
2005 directorial debut films
2005 films
Best Debut Feature Film of a Director National Film Award winners
Films about women in India
Films based on Indian novels
Films based on works by Sarat Chandra Chattopadhyay
Films set in Darjeeling
Films set in Kolkata
Films shot in Darjeeling
Films shot in Kolkata
Indian romantic drama films
Films directed by Pradeep Sarkar